The following table is a list of countries by number of public holidays excluding non-regular special holidays. Sovereign nations and territories observe holidays based on events of significance to their history, such as the National Day. For example, Chileans celebrate Fiestas Patrias.
They vary by country and may vary by year. Nepal has the highest number of public holidays in the word i.e 35 public holidays apart from 52 Saturdays.

References